Pokémon Home, stylized Pokémon HOME, is a free app for mobile and Nintendo Switch developed by ILCA and published by The Pokémon Company, part of the Pokémon series, released in February 2020. Its main use is providing cloud-based storage for Pokémon. It also contains the 'Global Trading System' (GTS) that was excluded from Pokémon Sword and Pokémon Shield, and provides the ability to transfer Pokémon from the previous storage system, Pokémon Bank for the Nintendo 3DS, as well as Pokémon Go, onto the Switch.

Synopsis 
Pokémon Home has two different versions; the Nintendo Switch version and the mobile version. Both versions are linked via Nintendo Account, and there exists both a free Basic Plan along with a paid Premium Plan. All users from both versions can also access a National Pokédex that updates as Pokémon are deposited into Home. If a user completes this Pokédex up to Eternatus, they receive a special Original Color Magearna as a reward. The Premium Plan allows users to transfer Pokémon from Pokémon Bank to the boxes in Home using both versions, although this is a one-way transfer, and also view the 'Individual Values' of a Pokémon. Users of both versions can unidirectionally transfer Pokémon from Pokémon Go to Pokémon Home without needing a Premium Plan.

Nintendo Switch Exclusive Features 

With the Basic Plan, users have access to the Basic Box which can hold up to 30 Pokémon from games such as Let's Go Pikachu!, Let's Go Eevee!, Sword, Shield, Brilliant Diamond, Shining Pearl, and Legends: Arceus. However, Pokémon cannot be transferred from Sword and Shield to Let's Go games, or vice versa. Users can move Pokémon in the Regional, Isle of Armor, and Crown Tundra Pokédexes in Sword and Shield to and from Pokémon Home. Points earned from depositing Pokémon in Home can be converted to Battle Points in Sword and Shield.

The Premium Plan grants access to all 200 boxes, capable of holding up to 6,000 Pokémon. Additionally, Pokémon from Pokémon Bank can be transferred to Home, and Premium Plan users have access to rewards from online competitions and Mystery Gifts in Sword and Shield.

Mobile Exclusive Features 
Users of the mobile Pokémon Home app can view Pokémon deposited from the Nintendo Switch version, but cannot move those Pokémon in or out of Pokémon Home. 

With the mobile version, users can trade Pokémon with others using multiple different features. The 'Wonder Box' allow users to put Pokémon up for trade and receive a Pokémon from another random user in return. Up to three Pokémon can be out in the Wonder Box at one time with the Basic Plan. Users can also access the Global Trading System, where other users put Pokémon up for trade in return for other Pokémon. One Pokémon can be put up for trade in the GTS with the Basic Plan, with users able to specify the level and type of Pokémon they want in return. Users can also search the GTS, using specifications such as level, type, whether they have the Pokémon the offerer wants and whether the offerer wants a Legendary/Mythical Pokémon. As of update 1.5.0, the user may also search the GTS by Pokémon the offerer asks for as well as by form and language, features that were not included in iterations of the GTS from previous games. Another feature allows users to enter another user's 'Room Trade' with three to twenty participants, where a user selects a Pokémon to trade and it is traded to another random person in the room. Finally, users can engage in 'Friend Trades' with users registered as friends via a friend code, acting similarly to Link Trades in Pokémon Sword and Shield.

Users of the Mobile version of Pokémon Home can receive Mystery Gifts, distributed for various reasons, and have the ability to check battle data from Sword and Shield and check Pokémon news.

The Premium Plan allows users to place up to ten Pokémon in the Wonder Box, three Pokémon in the GTS and create Trade Rooms.

How to play Pokémon Home

To play Pokémon Home, you will need to follow these steps:

 Download the Pokémon Home app: Pokémon Home is available on the Nintendo Switch, iOS, and Android. You can download the app from the respective app stores.
 Create an account: Once you have downloaded the app, you will need to create an account using your Nintendo account or your Pokémon Trainer Club account.
 Transfer your Pokémon: Once you have created an account, you can transfer your Pokémon from various Pokémon games, including Pokémon Sword and Shield, Pokémon Let's Go, Pikachu!, Pokémon Let's Go, Eevee!, Pokémon GO, and the Virtual Console versions of Pokémon Red, Blue, and Yellow.
 Organize your Pokémon: Pokémon Home allows you to organize your Pokémon by creating custom boxes and setting various filters to make it easier to find your favorite Pokémon.
 Trade Pokémon: You can trade Pokémon with other players using the Global Trade System (GTS) or Wonder Box.
 Participate in Pokémon events: Pokémon Home regularly hosts various events, including online competitions and distributions. You can participate in these events to receive rare and exclusive Pokémon.

Overall, Pokémon Home is an excellent tool for managing your Pokémon collection and connecting with other players from around the world.

References

Notes

External links 

 Official website

2020 video games
Android (operating system) games
Pokémon video games
IOS games
Nintendo Switch games
Video games developed in Japan